is a 2007 action film directed by Izuru Narushima and written by Yasuo Hasegawa and Kenzaburo Iida, based on the novel by Tetsuo Takashima. Midnight Eagle is the third film directed by Izuru Narushima.

The film opened in the United States on October 2, 2007 in Los Angeles. It was also shown October 20, 2007 at the Tokyo International Film Festival. The film opened in limited release in the United States in New York City on November 23, 2007, and opened in Los Angeles on December 7, 2007.

Production
Executive producers were Keiji Kameyama, Kazutaka Akimoto, Yasuhide Uno, Riki Takano, and Kanjiro Sakura. Producers were Michihiko Umezawa, Masakazu Yoda, Teruo Noguchi, Tomiyasu Moriya, and Kei Fujiki. The film was shot with the full cooperation of the Japan Ground Self Defense Force, Japan Air Self-Defense Force, and Ministry of Defense. Mountaineer Hirofumi Konishi was the special advisor for the scenes set in the Northern Alps. Before shooting started, the crew of the film was given training in snow-covered mountains. Midnight Eagle was the first mountain film set in Japan since The Precipice in 1958.

Plot
A top secret American forces strategic bomber known as "Midnight Eagle" suddenly vanishes in the Japanese Hida Mountains.

Cast
Takao Osawa as Yuji Nishizaki
Yūko Takeuchi as Keiko Arisawa
Hiroshi Tamaki as Shinichiro Ochiai
A-Saku Yoshida as Major Akihiko Saeki
Yoshihiko Hakamada as Toshimitsu Fuyuki
Nao Ōmori as Major Kensuke Saito
Ken Ishiguro as Tadao Miyata
Tatsuya Fuji as Prime Minister Watarase

Critical reception
The film received mixed reviews by Western critics. As of November 24, 2007 on the review aggregator Rotten Tomatoes, 20% of critics gave the film positive reviews, based on 5 reviews. On Metacritic, the film had an average score of 48 out of 100, based on 6 reviews.

References

External links
 
 
 
 
 
 

2007 films
2000s Japanese-language films
Mountaineering films
Japanese aviation films
2007 action films
Shochiku films
Films directed by Izuru Narushima
Japanese action films
2000s Japanese films